John Evans Barr (August 8, 1918 – July 1, 2002) was an American professional basketball player and coach. He played college basketball for the Penn State Nittany Lions.

Barr played for the St. Louis Bombers of the Basketball Association of America (BAA) for 58 games during the 1946–47 season. He was player-coach for the Sunbury Mercuries of the Eastern Professional Basketball League (EPBL) during the 1948–49 season. He led the Mercuries to a 9–21 record during his only season as head coach of the team.

Barr served as head coach of the Susquehanna River Hawks men's basketball team from 1957 to 1969, compiling a 107–115 record.

BAA career statistics

Regular season

References

External links

1918 births
2002 deaths
All-American college men's basketball players
American men's basketball coaches
American men's basketball players
Basketball coaches from Pennsylvania
Basketball players from Pennsylvania
Eastern Basketball Association coaches
Forwards (basketball)
Penn State Nittany Lions basketball players
St. Louis Bombers (NBA) players
Sunbury Mercuries players
Susquehanna River Hawks men's basketball coaches
Wilkes-Barre Barons players